Johnny Ray Seale (born November 14, 1938), nicknamed "Durango Kid", is a former Major League Baseball pitcher.

Sources

Major League Baseball pitchers
Detroit Tigers players
Gainesville G-Men players
Paris Lakers players
Durham Bulls players
Birmingham Barons players
Tulsa Oilers (baseball) players
Denver Bears players
Syracuse Chiefs players
Indianapolis Indians players
Seattle Angels players
Charlotte Hornets (baseball) players
Baseball players from Colorado
1938 births
Living people